Mikaela Ruef (born 15 January 1990) is an American professional basketball player. She currently plays for the Canberra Capitals in the WNBL.

Career

College
In college, Ruef attended Stanford University and whilst majoring in Management Science & Engineering before receiving a Master's Degree in Civil & Environmental Engineering, she played for the Stanford Cardinal from 2009–2014. During her time with Stanford, she  reached the NCAA Sweet 16 each season. She reached the NCAA Final Four in four of her five seasons and was a part of Stanford's 2009–10 Championship runner-up team as a freshman.

Australia
Ruef signed with the Sydney Uni Flames in Australia for the 2014–2015 WNBL season. During the off-season, Ruef played for the Launceston Tornadoes in the South East Australian Basketball League. She then returned for the following season of the WNBL only suiting in the colours of the Adelaide Lightning.  In May 2016 she was signed by the Canberra Capitals, her third team in three years.

France
One season in South-West of France, in Toulouse, in TMB club in LF2 (Women's League 2) in 2017-2018. She is one of the centerpieces of the team but gets a knee injury before the play-offs.

Stanford  statistics
Source

References

1990 births
Living people
Adelaide Lightning players
American expatriate basketball people in Australia
American expatriate basketball people in France
American women's basketball players
Basketball players from Dayton, Ohio
Canberra Capitals players
Forwards (basketball)
Logan Thunder players
Seattle Storm draft picks
Stanford Cardinal women's basketball players
Sydney Uni Flames players